Good Spirit Acres is a hamlet in the Canadian province of Saskatchewan. It is located 2 km south of Good Spirit Lake and Good Spirit Lake Provincial Park in the RM of Good Lake No. 274.

Good Spirit Golf Resort, an 18-hole golf course with a restaurant, accommodations, and recreation centre, is located next to the community. The accommodations include a hotel, cabins, and a campground.

Demographics 

Climate

See also 
 List of communities in Saskatchewan
 List of hamlets in Saskatchewan
 List of golf courses in Saskatchewan

References

External links 

Designated places in Saskatchewan
Good Lake No. 274, Saskatchewan
Organized hamlets in Saskatchewan
Division No. 9, Saskatchewan